The Ascrib Islands are a group of small uninhabited islands off the northwest coast of the Isle of Skye, in the Highland council area of Scotland. They are in Loch Snizort, between the Trotternish and Waternish peninsulas.

The islands include:
South Ascrib
Eilean Garave
Eilean Creagach
Eilean Iosal
Sgeir a' Chapuill
Sgeir a' Chuain
Scalp Rock

There are also a number of smaller skerries. There is a house on South Ascrib, the largest of the islands.

The islands were bought by Peter Palumbo, Baron Palumbo in 1985 and put up for sale again in the late 1990s.

Together with Isay and Loch Dunvegan, they are designated as a Special Area of Conservation owing to the breeding colonies of the common seal.

See also

 List of islands of Scotland

References

External links 

Skye and Lochalsh
Uninhabited islands of Highland (council area)
Archipelagoes of Scotland